Raynaud or Reynaud is a surname. Notable people with the surname include:

 Alexis Raynaud (born 1994), French sport shooter
 Alix Raynaud (born 1974), French executive producer and line producer
 André Raynaud (1904–1937), French cyclist
 Cecile Reynaud, volleyball player
 Émile Reynaud (1844–1918), animator and inventor
 Charles Ceccaldi-Raynaud (born 1925), French politician
 Colette Reynaud (1872–1965), French feminist, socialist and pacifist journalist
 Darius Reynaud (born 1985), American football player
 Fernand Raynaud (1926–1973), stand-up comic
 Jean Reynaud (1806–1863), philosopher
 Jordy Mont-Reynaud (born 1983), chess master
 Joëlle Ceccaldi-Raynaud (born 1951), politician
 Louis Raynaud, dit Blanchard (1789–1868), politician
 Marie-Line Reynaud (born 1954), politician
 Maurice Raynaud (1834–1881), doctor, discovered Raynaud syndrome
 Michel Raynaud, (1938–2018), mathematician
 Michèle Raynaud, (born 1938), mathematician
 Paul Reynaud (1878–1966), politician
 Raynald of Châtillon (1125–1187), knight
 Regnaud de La Porte (Raynaud) (died 1325), bishop and Cardinal
 Romain Reynaud (born 1983), Association football player
 Serge Raynaud de la Ferriere (1916–1962), philosopher
 Stéphane Reynaud, chef and cookery writer
 Théophile Raynaud (1583–1663), theologian
 Yelda Reynaud (born 1972), actress

See also
 Alain Raynaud, Bordeaux winemaker of Château Quinault
 François Dominique de Reynaud, Comte de Montlosier (1755–1838), politician
 Raynaud surface, type of algebraic surface
 Raynaud syndrome
 Raynaud's isogeny theorem
 Rey Robinson (born 1952), athlete
 Reynaud Des Marchais, Chevalier des Marchais, cartographer